Nicolae-Daniel Popescu (born May 31, 1981, Câmpulung Moldovenesc, Suceava County, Bukovina, Romania) is a Romanian politician currently serving as a Member of Parliament in the Chamber of Deputies. He is a vice-chair of the Committee for Romanian Communities Living Abroad, and a member of the Committee for Defence, Public Order, and National Security. Popescu is also a vice-leader of the Save Romania Union (USR) parliamentary group in the Chamber of Deputies.

Education and career 
Popescu graduated in 2004 with a bachelor's degree in law from the "Petre Andrei" University of Iasi. He has also completed a postgraduate programme in politics and European integration at the "Alexandru Ioan Cuza" University of Iasi (2007) and a postgraduate programme in security and good government from the “Carol I” National Defence University, Bucharest (2018).

Popescu has over 10 years of professional experience in education and research. He is a former researcher and manager of the research department at the National Recognition and Information Centre for the United Kingdom (UK NARIC) and an active member of the Romanian community in the UK. In 2012 he launched the Network of Romanian Professionals Abroad, and in 2015 the Romanian Gloucestershire weekend School in Cheltenham, attended by children of Romanian origins form Gloucestershire.

His work for the Romanian community was recognised in 2013 by the Romanian Embassy in the UK, which awarded him with an “Ambassador Diploma” in the category “Work for the Romanian Community” for the positive role he played in the process of integrating Romanian professionals into the British society, and for improving the recognition of Romanian qualifications in UK

References 

 Interviu cu Deputatul USR de diaspora, Daniel Popescu. «Consilierii mei sunt din diaspora», by Sorin Cehan, Gazeta Românească

External links 
  
 Daniel Popescu official profile at the Chamber of Deputies, Parliament of Romania (English)
 Daniel Popescu at Save Romania Union (Romanian)

1981 births
Living people
Members of the Chamber of Deputies (Romania)
Save Romania Union politicians
People from Câmpulung Moldovenesc